The Samuel Copeland House is a historic house located at 31 Harvard Street in Worcester, Massachusetts. Built c. 1847, the elaborate Greek Revival house is one two in the city with a full temple front.  The house was listed on the National Register of Historic Places on March 5, 1980.

Description and history
The Samuel Copeland House is located on the northern fringe of downtown Worcester, on the west side of Harvard Street.  It is a -story wood-frame structure, with a front-facing gabled roof and a clapboarded exterior.  The building's facade has a full two-story portico supported by four fluted Corinthian columns. Its triangular full pedimented gable with window framed by foliate decoration. Other windows on the main facade are topped by molded caps on consoles.  Building corners are adorned by pilasters.  A later single-story ell extends to the left of the main block.

The house was built by Samuel Copeland, a toolmaker who eventually founded the Copeland Hardware Manufacturing Company in c. 1865.  It is one of only two temple-fronted Greek Revival houses in the city (the other is the Arad Alexander House).  Copeland, a native of Thompson, Connecticut, worked for several local manufacturers before establishing his own firm, and claimed credit for inventing the first iron planing machine. Copeland owned the house until about 1863; its subsequent owners included a druggist, merchant, and county treasurer.

See also
National Register of Historic Places listings in northwestern Worcester, Massachusetts
National Register of Historic Places listings in Worcester County, Massachusetts

References

Houses completed in 1847
Houses in Worcester, Massachusetts
National Register of Historic Places in Worcester, Massachusetts
1847 establishments in Massachusetts
Houses on the National Register of Historic Places in Worcester County, Massachusetts
Greek Revival houses in Massachusetts